Redback Boots is an Australian footwear manufacturing company, owned by the Cloros family. It specializes in lightweight work boots, and has been a supplier of the Australian Army, with its "Terra" boot at times being standard issue.

Since 2000, the Australian Defence Force, primarily uses the Redback Terra Combat Boot as a replacement for the Vietnam War-era General Purpose combat boots. It was given a limited number of tests in 1999, and was later distributed in 2000.

Feedback
Despite the boot's general aptitude for the tasks which the ADF had first put it in place for, it still had major flaws. 90% of all negative feedback from soldiers was about its inappropriate sizing, having only 43 different sizes. Many also claimed that its sole would rot under worst-case tropical circumstances. Various military personnel have also used Rossi Boots.

References

External links

StockXPro Shoes
Repsneakers Site

Military boots
Shoe companies of Australia
Australian military uniforms
Manufacturing companies based in Sydney